Federal elections were held in Switzerland on 28 October 1866. The Radical Left remained the largest group in the National Council.

Electoral system
The 128 members of the National Council were elected in 47 single- and multi-member constituencies; there was one seat for every 20,000 citizens, with seats allocated to cantons in proportion to their population. The elections were held using a three-round system; candidates had to receive a majority in the first or second round to be elected; if it went to a third round, only a plurality was required. Voters could cast as many votes as there were seats in their constituency. In six cantons (Appenzell Innerrhoden, Appenzell Ausserrhoden, Glarus, Nidwalden, Obwalden and Uri), National Council members were elected by the Landsgemeinde.

Results

National Council 
Voter turnout was highest in the Canton of Schaffhausen (where voting was compulsory) at 86.3% and lowest in the Canton of Schwyz at 18.7%.

By constituency

Council of States

References

1866
1866 elections in Europe
1866 in Switzerland